The GE C40-8M is a 6-axle diesel locomotive built by GE Transportation Systems from 1990 to 1994. It is part of the GE Dash 8 Series of freight locomotives, and is often referred to as a Dash 8-40CM.

Mechanically identical to the Dash 8-40CW, the Dash 8-40CM was constructed only for Canadian railways, with a production total of 84 units. It is distinguished from the Dash 8-40CW by the addition of a full-width "Draper Taper" style cowl body, of which they are the last locomotives built with this feature, and the use of a Canadian-specific nose and windshield configuration. The trucks also differ; all units built ride on Dofasco Hi-Ad trucks identical to locomotives built by Montreal Locomotive Works, Bombardier, and Morrison-Knudsen.

Technical 
The Dash 8-40CM is powered by a  7FDL-16 diesel engine driving a GE GMG187 main alternator. The power generated by the main alternator drives six GE 752AG or 752AH direct current traction motors, each with a gear ratio of 83:20 and connected to  wheels which allow the Dash 8-40CM a maximum speed of 70 mph (110 km/h).

Like most North American diesel locomotives, the Dash 8-40CM uses normal water for cooling.

Original owners

See also

List of GE locomotives

References

Notes

Further reading 
 
 
 

General Electric locomotives
C-C locomotives
Diesel-electric locomotives of Canada
Freight locomotives
Diesel-electric locomotives of the United States